Dr. Colin Kruse is a bible commentator and senior lecturer in New Testament at the Melbourne School of Theology.

Kruse's academic education started at the Australian College of Theology and continued with study for his BDiv at the University of London. He remained at London to do his MPhil but moved to Fuller Theological Seminary to read for his Ph.D.

After being ordained he initially worked in the Anglican ministry with parochial responsibility in Australia and the USA. He and his wife Rosemary joined the Church Missionary Society of Australia (CMS), where he served as a theological lecturer in Indonesia. Follow this he pursued an academic career first at Ridley College (for 16 years) before moving to the then Bible College of Victoria, now the Melbourne School of Theology.

He writes various journal articles on the New Testament, Old Testament, and the Dead Sea Scrolls, he has authored several books mainly of New Testment commentary and on various forms of Christian ministry. Colin recently released a commentary on Paul's Letter to the Romans for the Pillar New Testament Commentary series by Eerdmans/IVP.

Besides journal articles on the New Testament, Old Testament and the Dead Sea Scrolls, Kruse has authored several books including Paul, the Law and Justification and New Testament Models for Ministry: Jesus and Paul. He has also written the Tyndale New Testament Commentary on 2 Corinthians and the Pillar New Testament Commentary titles The Letters of John and Paul's Letter to the Romans.



Selected works

Books

Articles & chapters

References

External links
Melbourne School of Theology profile for Kruse

Living people
Bible commentators
Australian Christian theologians

Year of birth missing (living people)